Hatem Al-Iraqi (born March 20, 1969) is an Iraqi song writer and composer who rose to fame in the early 1990s in the Middle East. He has released over 25 albums since the start of his music career and has performed worldwide.

Biography

Hatem al-Iraqi, born Hatem Abbas Farawi, on March 20, 1969, in the city of al -Thawrah, Sadr City, Baghdad, worked as an oil salesman in Sadr City before the start of his music career. He started recording music in his home town before his career took off in the late 1980s with his first ever song titled "Makhtouba" played on radio. He released his first album titled Afker Feek in 1990, with his first appearance on national television in 1991, with the song titled "Tamanite". He has collaborated with many famous Middle Eastern artists including Kathem Al Saher, Rahma Riad, Muhannad Mohsen and Shatha Hassoun. He has also appeared as a guest performer on Arab Idol on a few occasions.

Discography
 1990 – Afker Feek
 1991 – Tmneet
 1992 – Nihayat Hobena
 1993 – Ween Alkak 
 1994 – Rasaʼel Ateb
 1995 – Al-Nar
 1996 – Ana Al-Majrouh
 1997 – Azkrek
 1998 – Ellilah
 1999 – Abou Samira
 2000 – Ya Ba'ad Qalbi
 2001 – Bedon Tawakof
 2002 – Amir Al-Ashiqeen
 2004 – Khalek Ma'a
 2005 – Mohajer
 2006 – Ya Tair
 2008 – Rayeh
 2010 – Aldonia Ma Teswa
 2012 – Zakernakem
 2014 – Hada Al Iraki
 2017 – Anghami
 2017 - "Dictory"
 2021

References 



1969 births
Living people
Musicians from Baghdad
20th-century Iraqi male singers
Iraqi composers
21st-century Iraqi male singers